Christine Amoako-Nuamah (born 3 February 1944 in Bekwai, Ashanti Region, Ghana) is a Ghanaian scientist and politician who served as the Minister for Environment, Science and Technology (1993–1996), Minister for Education (1997–1998), and Minister for Lands and Forestry (1998–2001) under the Rawlings government. She was educated at the University of Ghana, Legon and was a postgraduate student of the Ghanaian botanist, George C. Clerk (1931–2019). She served as a presidential adviser to the Mills and Mahama governments. She was also the board chairman of the Ghana Institute of Management and Public Administration governing council.

References

Living people
1944 births
Women government ministers of Ghana
Ghanaian biologists
Ghanaian scientists
Ghanaian women scientists
Akan people
Ghanaian Protestants
University of Ghana alumni
Ghanaian presidential advisors